St Gabriel's Academy was an English-medium convent school from Kindergarten through Grade 12 located in the town of Roorkee, Uttarakhand, India. It was affiliated to Central Board of Secondary Education(CBSE). In 2012 the school was rechristened as Army Public School No.2, and is now under Army Public School management.

The academy had the unique distinction of being located between Asia's first engineering college, IIT Roorkee, and India's oldest military cantonment, the Bengal Engineer Group (Bengal Sappers). in Roorkee.

History
St Gabriel's Academy was founded in 1962 by the Montfort Brothers of St. Gabriel, an international Catholic religious institute founded by Saint Louis de Montfort in 1703. It had been dedicated to the motto "Freedom in Truth". The brothers were responding to an invitation from Brig. Mark Valladares, then commandant of the Bengal Engineer Group. The school had only 26 students on roll, all accommodated in the hostel, housed in Gen. William's bungalow along with the brothers. The school continued to function in the same building till 1965. A three-storey building was put up by the BEG with the expertise of Central Building Research Institute within a span of three months.

The students continued to stay in William's bungalow till 1967, after which they were shifted to the 1st floor of one of the wings of the school building. The hostel was closed down in 1973 due to shortage of accommodation as the size of the school had increased considerably. Till 1975 school consisted of classes IV to IX. After 1975 classes X, XI and XII were introduced. In the 1978–79 academic year, primary classes of LKG and UKG were added. In 2012 the school celebrated its golden jubilee, marking its presence of 50 years. 

In 2014, the school was rechristened as Army Public School No.2 and the change of guard took place from Society of Brothers of St. Gabriels to Army Public School management. Since then school has been run and managed by Army Public School management.

Society of Brothers St. Gabriel
The Brothers of St. Gabriel have their headquarters at Rome and zonal headquarters in Bhopal. The society has institutions spread all over the globe in 33 countries. The Society runs about 120 institutions including schools, technical training institutes, orphanages, institutions for the differently abled (deaf, dumb and blind) and homes for the aged. The Society is also engaged in rural development programs and other programs for empowering the urban poor through Peoples’ Initiative Network.

Honorable brothers and principals
Rev. Bro. Julian    - (1962–66)
Rev. Bro. Ambrose   - (1962–72)
Rev. Bro. Peter     - (1972–73)
Rev. Bro. Joseph    - (1972–78)
Rev. Bro. Antony    - (1978–79)
Rev. Bro. Emmanuel  - (1979–85)
Rev. Bro. Scaria    - (1985–91)
Rev. Bro. Chacko    - (1991–94)
Rev. Bro. Raja      - (1994–95)
Rev. Bro. Mani      - (1995-04)
Rev. Bro. George    - (2004-2008)
Rev. Bro. Cyriac N.T -(2008-2012)
Mr. Sandeep Pant    - (2012-2020 )

Co- and extracurricular activities
The school hosted intra- and inter-school competitions every year in the form of an Annual Sports Meet and Annual Cultural Function. Besides that, the academy hosted national-level talent examinations like the NTSE and the National Maths and Science Olympiads. Every year it hosted a science exhibition where students exhibited their scientific talent. Students took active part in civil programs like a pulse polio program, environmental awareness programs, and health awareness drives.

The academy had the unique distinction of having NCC (National Cadet Corps) at its campus, and students taking part in the junior division of the NCC. The academy also hosted an annual NCC training camp. 

Each year the academy hosted the inter-school "Sir Donald Memorial Cricket Tournament," inviting cricketing talent from across India.

Alumni
The Gabrielite Alumni Association was formed by the ex-students of St. Gabriel's Academy which students join after passing out from the academy. The association organizes alumni meets every year in the month of December. A good number of students every year were selected in various competitive examinations including the  JEE (Main), NEET, and NDA.

Notable alumni
Rishabh Pant
Mohammad Samad

References
WikiMapia Link

External links

School website
CBSE Website with School Details
Roorkee.org
Gabriel's Yaddein
Annual Day Function
Montfort School New Delhi
 APS2 news event

Brothers of Christian Instruction of St Gabriel schools
Catholic secondary schools in India
International schools in India
Primary schools in India
High schools and secondary schools in Uttarakhand
Education in Roorkee
Educational institutions established in 1962
1962 establishments in Uttar Pradesh
Schools in Uttarakhand